Investigative Ophthalmology & Visual Science (IOVS) is an online journal published by the Association for Research in Vision and Ophthalmology (ARVO).

History
The journal was established as an official publication of the Association for Research in Ophthalmology (later renamed the Association for Research in Vision and Ophthalmology). The first issue of Investigative Ophthalmology was published in January 1962, with Bernard Becker, MD, as the Executive Editor. The title was changed to Investigative Ophthalmology & Visual Science in 1977.

Abstracts from the ARVO Annual Meeting have been published as an issue of IOVS since 1977. 

Also in 1977, IOVS was accepted for inclusion in Index Medicus (and later in MEDLINE) and PubMed.

IOVS was first published online in 1999, with scanned back content being made available online in 2005. The last print issue was published in 2009, and the journal is now published online only.

In January 2016, IOVS ended its subscription program and became open access. All content is freely available to read, and content published 2016-onward is freely available for reuse under either the Creative Commons Attribution-NonCommercial-NoDerivatives license or Creative Commons Attribution license.

Editors

 1962–1972: Bernard Becker
 1973–1977: Herbert E. Kaufman
 1978–1982: Alan M. Laties
 1983–1987: Steven M. Podos
 1988–1992: J. Terry Ernest
 1993–1997: Harry A. Quigley
 1998–2002: Gerald J. Chader
 2003–2007: Robert N. Frank
 2008–2012: Paul L. Kaufman
 2013–2015: David C. Beebe
 2015–2017: Thomas Yorio
 2017-2022: Donald C. Hood
 2023-2027: Joseph Carroll

See also
Journal of Vision

References

External links
 IOVS - Investigative Ophthalmology & Visual Science
 ARVO - Association for Research in Vision and Ophthalmology

Ophthalmology journals
Publications established in 1976
Monthly journals
English-language journals
Academic journals published by learned and professional societies of the United States
Online-only journals